Namwon station is a KTX station in the city of Namwon, North Jeolla Province, on the southern coast of South Korea. It is on the Jeolla Line.

External links
 Cyber station information from Korail

Railway stations in North Jeolla Province
Namwon
Railway stations opened in 1933
Korea Train Express stations